Knights of the South Bronx is a 2005 American drama television film directed by Allen Hughes and written by Jamal Joseph and Dianne Houston. Based on a true story, it stars Ted Danson as a teacher who helps students at a tough South Bronx elementary school to succeed by teaching them to play chess. It aired on A&E on December 6, 2005.

Plot summary
The film is based on the true story of David MacEnulty, who taught schoolchildren of the Bronx Community Elementary School 70 to play at competition level, eventually winning New York City and the New York State Chess Championships. The screenplay portrays whistle-blowing and a mid-life crisis that combine to remove Richard Mason (played by Ted Danson) from his old life. He becomes a substitute teacher and is assigned to a fourth-grade class in a South Bronx school. In the class are students with parents who are drug addicts or in jail or just scrambling to pay the bills. Few of them see a purpose in school other than meeting society's requirements, and he struggles, mostly in vain, to reach them.

Then a student whose father is in jail sees Mason in the park playing a simultaneous exhibition, and beating fourteen opponents at once.  He asks to learn the game.  One thing leads to another, and soon the entire class is interested in the game.  Mason convinces them that on the chessboard it doesn't matter how much money you have or what clothes you're wearing or where you come from, and that it's only the moves you make, then and there.  The class forms a team to compete in ever-larger tournaments.

Cast
 Ted Danson - Mr. Richard Mason
 Malcolm David Kelley - Jimmy Washington
 Brian Markinson - Arnie
 Kate Vernon - Pat Mason
 Yves Michel-Beneche - MD Duprais
 Yucini Diaz - Renee
 Antonio Ortiz - Dawson
 Eugene Clark - Gene
 Keke Palmer - Kenya Russell
 Clifton Powell - Cokey
 Devon Bostick - Darren
 Sandi Ross - Principal Nettie Weston
 Karen LeBlanc - Dolly
 Philip Akin - Asst. Principal Allen Hill
 Alex Karzis - Kasparov
 Nicholas Carpenter - Dawson's Opponent

Production
The film was announced in January 2004, under the working title Chessmates. Filming took place in Toronto. David MacEnulty, the inspiration for the film's main character, taught the basics of chess to the child actors.

References

External links

2005 television films
2005 films
2005 drama films
2000s American films
2000s English-language films
A&E (TV network) original films
American drama television films
American films based on actual events
Chess in the United States
Drama films based on actual events
Films about chess
Films about educators
Films directed by the Hughes brothers
Films set in the Bronx
Films shot in Toronto
Television films based on actual events